The Catskill Charcoal Ovens, near Raton, New Mexico, date from 1892.  They were listed on the National Register of Historic Places in 1978.

The Sangre de Cristo Mountains are to their west.

References

Charcoal ovens
National Register of Historic Places in Colfax County, New Mexico
Buildings and structures completed in 1892